Frank Hanford (January 9, 1853 – November 20, 1921) was an American politician and businessman in the state of Washington. He was elected to the Seattle City Council in 1890 and the Washington House of Representatives in 1895.

Hanford was president and treasurer of the Tubal-Cain Copper & Manganese Mining Company, which owned the Tubal Cain mine in the Olympic Mountains.

References

External links
 

Republican Party members of the Washington House of Representatives
1853 births
1921 deaths
People from Van Buren County, Iowa